Hwang Kyung-seon (born May 21, 1986), also spelled Hwang Kyung-sun, is a female South Korean Taekwondo practitioner. She is a two-time Olympic Champion from 2008 and 2012 Summer Olympics.

Olympics
In 2008, she won the gold medal in the -67kg category at the Beijing Olympic Games, beating 2007 world lightweight (-63 kg) champion Karine Sergerie of Canada in the final.

In 2012, she won the gold medal in the -67kg category at the London Olympic Games, beating 2012 European Champion (-67 kg) Nur Tatar of Turkey in the final. She became the first Korean female athlete (and the second Korean) to defend an individual title in the Summer Olympics and to win an Olympic individual medal in a particular event in three consecutive Olympic Games, Jin Jong-oh in shooting having achieved the same feats for men's 50 m pistol earlier in the 2012 Summer Olympics. At 26, she became the youngest Korean to achieve these records. She also became the first woman ever to win three Olympic taekwondo medals.
She has won 2 gold medals and 1 bronze medal.

References

 Hwang Kyung-seon profile on DatabaseOlympics.com

External links
 

1986 births
Asian Games medalists in taekwondo
Living people
Medalists at the 2004 Summer Olympics
Medalists at the 2008 Summer Olympics
Medalists at the 2012 Summer Olympics
Olympic bronze medalists for South Korea
Olympic gold medalists for South Korea
Olympic medalists in taekwondo
Olympic taekwondo practitioners of South Korea
People from Namyangju
South Korean female taekwondo practitioners
Taekwondo practitioners at the 2004 Summer Olympics
Taekwondo practitioners at the 2006 Asian Games
Taekwondo practitioners at the 2008 Summer Olympics
Taekwondo practitioners at the 2012 Summer Olympics
Asian Games gold medalists for South Korea
Medalists at the 2006 Asian Games
Universiade medalists in taekwondo
Pyeonghae Hwang clan
Universiade silver medalists for South Korea
World Taekwondo Championships medalists
Sportspeople from Gyeonggi Province
21st-century South Korean women